Second Persian Empire may refer to either of two historical states:

 Parthian Empire, an ethnic Parthian state in ancient Iran lasting from 247 BCE to 224 CE, sometimes considered to be an iteration of Persia
 Sasanian Empire, its Persian successor from 224 CE to 651 CE